The 1986 NCAA Division I-AA football season, part of college football in the United States organized by the National Collegiate Athletic Association at the Division I-AA level, began in August 1986, and concluded with the 1986 NCAA Division I-AA Football Championship Game on December 19, 1986, at the Tacoma Dome in Tacoma, Washington. The Georgia Southern Eagles won their second consecutive I-AA championship, defeating the Arkansas State Indians by a score of 48–21.

Conference changes and new programs
Prior to the season, the Colonial League, now known as the Patriot League, was established as a six-member, football-only league for teams in Massachusetts, New York, and Pennsylvania. The Colonial League, however, was totally separate from the current Colonial Athletic Association.
Prior to the 1986 season, the Gateway Conference was formed out of the four remaining members of the disbanded Association of Mid-Continent Universities (Eastern Illinois, Northern Iowa, Western Illinois, Southwest Missouri State) and two former members of the Missouri Valley Conference (Illinois State and Southern Illinois). The MVC stopped sponsoring football after the 1985 season.

Conference standings

Conference champions

Postseason
The playoffs expanded from twelve to sixteen teams this season, eliminating the bye for the top four seeds.

The I-AA playoff field remained at sixteen through the 2009 season, expanding to twenty in 2010 and 24 in 2013.

NCAA Division I-AA playoff bracket
The top four teams were seeded, with remaining teams placed in the bracket based on geographical considerations.

* Denotes host institution

References